RoboCop refers to a comic book series spun off from the feature film of the same name.

Storyline 
The main character is a police officer from future Detroit who gets murdered in the line of duty. He is revived and transformed into a cybernetic cop by the megacorporation Omni Consumer Products (OCP) and now goes by RoboCop. Since the debut of the character in 1987, the franchise have been exercised through various media, including multiple comic book mini-series and ongoing series.

Marvel Comics

In March 1990, Marvel Comics released the first issue of an ongoing RoboCop superhero comic book series based on the film. The series ran for 23 issues, ending in January 1992. In addition, a one-shot was released in August 1990, reprinting in color the 1987 black and white magazine adaptation of the film.  That same month also saw a black and white magazine adaptation of the film sequel RoboCop 2, as well as a three issue mini-series, printing in color the same contents as the RoboCop 2 magazine. (The RoboCop 2 adaptation, as well as the monthly comic, are notable for depicting the same locations, set design and OCP logo as the first film and not the substitute designs/sets seen in the actual film RoboCop 2. This would continue in the Dark Horse comics).

The stories told within these issues take place between the second and third RoboCop films. Entering a Marvel Universe, though not the main superhero universe by Marvel, RoboCops futuristic setting is expanded with more futuristic elements like gangs riding on hover bikes, urban droids carrying out public services like waste disposal, and the fact that almost anyone with the know-how or money can create a giant killer robot. About mid-way through the comic's run, pressure from fan letters convinced Marvel to eliminate some of the more fantastical elements, such as flying characters, citing that RoboCop was set only in the near future. This led to a few conundrums and contradictions such as having biker gangs riding flying cycles in one issue and then switching to standard motorcycles in the next. The comic also had to uncomfortably deal with inconsistent characterization misconceptions in the films. For example, in the first movie, OCP's Chairman "The Old Man" is portrayed as a good-natured oldster who grew OCP from a small business and has little patience for the greedy corporate types he employs. In the second film, his character has changed to a corrupt villain. This proved very unpopular with fans of the first film who had liked the character. It also created a major paradox for the writers of the Marvel comic monthly series, as we see the "Old Man" as a good guy in the RoboCop film adaptation, as a villain in the RoboCop 2 adaptation, and strictly a good guy in the early monthly series of original stories. What followed was a transformation that uncomfortably teetered between strictly well intended, morally ambiguous, and corrupt, but with a good excuse. Another slight, yet noticeable, change was the character of OCP executive Donald Johnson name to Daniel Johnson. This was most likely to avoid criticism from fans of the TV series Miami Vice, though the original naming of the character was likely an in-joke referring to Miami Vice star Don Johnson.

The consistent theme throughout the 23 issues is RoboCop's continuing struggle to balance his humanity with the machine made after his brutal death. In the meantime, he fights street gangs, gangsters, drug pushers, addicts, politicians, terrorists, killer robots, mad scientist, cyborg animals, corrupt OCP employees, OCP's rival companies, foreign nations, mercenaries, OCP's attempts to mass produce RoboCops, and competitive attempts to do the same, as well as criticisms from an otherwise well-meaning public.

RoboCop (one-shot film adaptation) (Oct 1987)

RoboCop Vol. 1 (23 issue ongoing series) (Mar 1990–Jan 1992)

RoboCop 2 (3-issue film adaptation mini-series) (Aug–Sep 1990)
This series was originally released as a black-and-white magazine format (just like the first film adaptation) on June 5, 1990, and then was printed in a color trade paperback format on June 12, 1990 before finally being split up and released as a three-issue mini-series (which was also in color) starting on June 26, 1990, and running through to July 24.

Dark Horse Comics
The comic book license for RoboCop was then acquired by Dark Horse Comics. Between May and August 1992, Dark Horse released a four issue mini-series RoboCop Versus The Terminator, written by Frank Miller, with artwork by Walt Simonson.  This led to several new RoboCop mini-series by Dark Horse as follows:

RoboCop Versus The Terminator (4-issue mini-series) (Sep–Dec 1992)
See RoboCop Versus The Terminator for main article and issue summaries.

RoboCop: Prime Suspect (4-issue mini-series) (Oct 1992–Jan 1993)
This mini-series follows RoboCop being framed for murder and his attempts to clear his name. It takes place shortly after RoboCop 3.

RoboCop 3 (3-issue film adaptation mini-series) (Jul–Nov 1993)
This mini-series adapts the film of the same name.

RoboCop: Mortal Coils (4-issue mini-series) (Sep-Dec 1993)
This mini-series has RoboCop chasing down some criminals related to a coffin from a recent OCP break-in as he follows them to a snowy Denver, Colorado.

RoboCop: Roulette (4-issue mini-series) (Dec 1993–Mar 1994)
Bodies keep popping up in Old Detroit which slowly keep leading back to OCP. There is also an ED-209 unit on a rampage which RoboCop must put a stop to. It takes place right after RoboCop: Prime Suspect.

Two mini-stories were also published in the series "Dark Horse Comics".
Dark Horse Comics #1–3 provided the events that led up to the story presented in Prime Suspect.
Dark Horse Comics #6–9 provided the events that led up to the story presented in Mortal Coils.

A RoboCop versus Predator comic was proposed for Dark Horse.  Some of the proposal pages by Joshua Boulet can be seen at the RoboCop Archive website.

Avatar Press

Almost a decade later, the comic rights to RoboCop were acquired by Avatar Press. Upon announcing the acquisition, the company's publisher, William Christensen, received several offers from artists and writers hoping to contribute to the project (which eventually led to the Avatar one-shot RoboCop: Killing Machine).

Frank Miller's RoboCop (9-issue ongoing series) (Jul 2003–Jan 2006)
William Christensen was interested in producing a comic adaptation of Miller's "lost" screenplay, of which he possessed a copy. Christensen soon got in contact with Miller, who was enthusiastic about the idea of his story finally being told uncensored.

The series was personally overseen by Miller, based on his own unused screenplay for the film RoboCop 2 and notes of unused ideas for RoboCop 3; however, scheduling prohibited him from personally writing the comic adaptation or illustrating it.  It was written by Steven Grant, a long-time acquaintance of Miller's who had written the comic adaptation of RoboCop 3 for Dark Horse Comics.  Juan Jose Ryp, best known for illustrating the Avatar comic Another Suburban Romance (written by Alan Moore), became the title's illustrator while Miller drew covers.

The series was composed of nine issues that were published from August 2003 through February 2004 under Avatar's Pulsar Press line, which specializes in licensed comic properties from movies. Issues featured covers by Miller and alternative covers by Ryp.

Reception
Critical reaction to Frank Miller's RoboCop comic has been mixed. Randy Lander of comic review site The Fourth Rail gave the first issue a score of 7 out of 10, saying that "there's not a lot of personality to the book" but added that it's "certainly interesting to read and full of potential."

Ken Tucker of Entertainment Weekly gave the comic a "D" score, criticizing the "tired story" and lack of "interesting action." A recap written for the pop culture humor website I-Mockery said, "Having spent quite a lot of time with these comics over the past several days researching and writing this article, I can honestly say that it makes me want to watch the movie version of RoboCop 2 again just so I can get the bad taste out of my mouth. Or prove to myself that the movie couldn't be worse than this."

Continuity
Picking up after the events of the first film. Frank Miller's vision is quite different from the comics that came before and is at odds with established continuity, especially RoboCop 3 and the Dark Horse Comics run.

RoboCop: Killing Machine (one-shot) (Aug 2004)

RoboCop: Wild Child (one-shot) (Jan 2005)

Wild Child contained an advertisement for a three-issue mini-series called "Robocop: War Party", again from Grant & Ferreira.  However, the mini-series was never published and it is not clear how much work was done on it apart from Ferreira's full page advert.

Dynamite Entertainment

RoboCop Vol 1: Revolution
Dynamite Entertainment announced they would be producing the next RoboCop with writer Rob Williams and artist Fabiano Neves.  The first Dynamite solo adventure was "Revolution" which was later collected as a trade paperback.

Terminator/RoboCop: Kill Human Vol 1
The first Dynamite RoboCop and Terminator crossover, Terminator/RoboCop: Kill Human Vol 1, and the second overall.  Later collected as a trade paperback.

RoboCop Vol 2: Road Trip
Second Dynamite solo adventure.  A trade paperback was scheduled for release in August 2014 but did not materialize.

BOOM! Studios
In 2013, Boom! Studios obtained the rights to produce a new RoboCop series as well as republishing Frank Miller's Robocop.

RoboCop Vol 1
A republishing of the Avatar series Frank Miller's Robocop.  BOOM! Studios released their own trade paperback of the series under the name RoboCop Volume One, which was larger in size and featured some black and white sketches as additional material.

RoboCop Vol 2: Last Stand Part One
Last Stand is an eight issue mini-series written by Steven Grant, adapting Frank Miller's original screenplay to RoboCop 3.  The first four issues have been collected in trade paperback.

RoboCop Vol 3: Last Stand Part Two
The last four issues were published in trade paperback in December 2014.

RoboCop: The Human Element
Boom published four one-shot comics set in the 2014 film reboot universe.  These were collected in a trade paperback under the banner title "RoboCop: The Human Element" in which the stories are presented in the reverse order to which they were published.  A fifth comic entitled "The Gauntlet" was made available exclusively for digital download with Target's exclusive edition of the Blu-Ray film release and did not feature in the collected trade paperback.

Beta is the first RoboCop story not to feature the character of RoboCop himself, as it follows a soldier who becomes a RoboSoldier.

RoboCop: Dead Or Alive
In 2015, following the movie reboot tie-ins, BOOM! announced a new ongoing series set after events in the original 1987 film.  Individual titles were simply published as "RoboCop", although collected trade paperbacks are titled "RoboCop: Dead Or Alive".  The 12-issue series was written by Joshua Williamson with art by Carlos Magno for the first eight issues, while Dennis Culver handled penciling duties for the final four issues.

RoboCop: Citizens Arrest
In January 2018, BOOM! Studios announced a new ongoing series set 30 years after events in the first film where "justice is crowdsourced".  The first issue was published April 2018.  
It was written by Brian Wood with art by Jorge Coelho.

In the decades since the RoboCop program first began, corporations have taken over public services and the government—and law enforcement is the biggest private contract of all. Traditional police forces no longer exist as all citizens are encouraged—and rewarded—to spy on their neighbors. There is only one authority on the streets: ROBOCOP.

Collected editions
MARVEL
 RoboCop (movie adaptation)
 RoboCop 2 (movie adaptation)

DARK HORSE
 RoboCop: Prime Suspect
 RoboCop Versus The Terminator (original Dark Horse TPB)

AVATAR
 Frank Miller's RoboCop

DYNAMITE
 RoboCop Vol 1: Revolution 
 Terminator/RoboCop: Kill Human

BOOM! STUDIOS
 RoboCop Vol 1 (reprint of Avatar series "Frank Miller's RoboCop")
 RoboCop Vol 2: Last Stand Part One (collects issues #1-4)
 RoboCop: The Human Element (collects the one-shots "Beta", "Memento Mori", "To Live And Die In Detroit" & "Hominem Ex Machina")
 RoboCop Versus The Terminator (remastered edition of Dark Horse series, hardcover, July 2014)
 RoboCop Versus The Terminator: Gallery Edition (Oversized black & white edition of Dark Horse series, hardcover, July 2014)
 RoboCop Vol 3: Last Stand Part Two (collects issues #5-8, Dec 2014)
 RoboCop: Dead Or Alive Volume One (collects issues #1-4, Aug 2015)
 RoboCop: Dead Or Alive Volume Two (collects issues #5-8, Feb 2016)
 The Complete Frank Miller RoboCop Omnibus (collects RoboCop Vol 1-3, Dec 2016)
 RoboCop: Dead Or Alive Volume Three (collects issues #9-12, Mar 2017)
 RoboCop: Citizens Arrest (collects all issues #1-5, Dec 2018)
All Boom! Studios collected editions from The Human Element onwards are available on ComiXology with animated zooming panels, except the Gallery Edition of RoboCop Versus The Terminator.

The following were previously listed on Amazon for release but have not been released to date:

 RoboCop Omnibus (Dark Horse)
 RoboCop Vol 2: Road Trip (Dynamite)

References

External links
 The official website for the mini-series by Avatar Press
 Reviews of the various RoboCop comic book series

1990 comics debuts
1992 comics debuts
2009 comics debuts
Comics by Frank Miller (comics)
Dark Horse Comics limited series
Dynamite Entertainment titles
Marvel Comics titles
RoboCop comics